The 1982 San Francisco Giants season was the Giants' 100th season in Major League Baseball, their 25th season in San Francisco since their move from New York following the 1957 season, and their 23rd at Candlestick Park. The team finished in third place in the National League West with an 87–75 record, 2 games behind the Atlanta Braves.

Offseason 
 December 9, 1981: Larry Herndon was traded by the Giants to the Detroit Tigers for Dan Schatzeder and Mike Chris. 
 December 11, 1981: Jerry Martin was traded by the Giants to the Kansas City Royals for Rich Gale and Bill Laskey.
 February 18, 1982: Dennis Littlejohn was traded by the Giants to the Kansas City Royals for Jeff Cornell.
 March 4, 1982: Enos Cabell and cash was traded by the Giants to the Detroit Tigers for Champ Summers.
 March 30, 1982: Vida Blue and Bob Tufts were traded by the Giants to the Kansas City Royals for Renie Martin, Craig Chamberlain, Atlee Hammaker, and Brad Wellman.
 March 30, 1982: Doyle Alexander was traded by the Giants to the New York Yankees for Andy McGaffigan and Ted Wilborn.

Regular season 
 In 1982, the Los Angeles Dodgers and San Francisco Giants were tied for second place, one game behind the Atlanta Braves, as they faced each other in the final three games of the year. The Dodgers won the first two games, 4–0 on Friday and 15–4 on Saturday, to eliminate the Giants, then the Giants knocked the Dodgers out of the pennant race on the season's last day on a 7th-inning, three-run homer by Joe Morgan, winning the game, 5–3. Thus, the Braves finished first by one game. The Giants were 48–52 and 14 games behind the Braves on July 30 but they finished the season with a 39–23 run that put them back in the thick of things.

Opening Day starters 
Jack Clark
Chili Davis
Darrell Evans
Al Holland
Johnnie LeMaster
Jeffrey Leonard
Milt May
Joe Morgan
Reggie Smith

Season standings

Record vs. opponents

Notable transactions 
 June 7, 1982: 1982 Major League Baseball draft
Steve Stanicek was drafted by the Giants in the first round (11th pick).
Barry Bonds was drafted by the Giants in the second round, but did not sign.
Randy Bockus was drafted by the Giants in the 34th round of the 1982 amateur draft.
 June 14, 1982: Pat Larkin was signed as an amateur free agent by the Giants.
 June 15, 1982: Dan Schatzeder was purchased from the Giants by the Montreal Expos.

Roster

Player stats

Batting

Starters by position 
Note: Pos = Position; G = Games played; AB = At bats; R = Runs; H = Hits; 2B = Doubles; 3B = Triples; HR = Home runs; RBI = Runs batted in; Avg. = Batting average; SB = Stolen bases

Other batters 
Note: G = Games played; AB = At bats; R = Runs; H = Hits; Avg. = Batting average; HR = Home runs; RBI = Runs batted in; SB = Stolen bases

Pitching

Starting pitchers 
Note: G = Games pitched; CG = Complete games; IP = Innings pitched; W = Wins; L = Losses; ERA = Earned run average; SO = Strikeouts

Other pitchers 
Note: G = Games pitched; IP = Innings pitched; W = Wins; L = Losses; ERA = Earned run average; SO = Strikeouts

Relief pitchers 
Note: G = Games pitched; IP = Innings pitched; W = Wins; L = Losses; SV = Saves; ERA = Earned run average; SO = Strikeouts

Awards and honors 
 1982 Joe Morgan 2B, Willie Mac Award
All-Star Game

Farm system

References

External links
 1982 San Francisco Giants team at Baseball-Reference
 1982 San Francisco Giants team page at Baseball Almanac

San Francisco Giants seasons
San Francisco Giants season
1982 in San Francisco
San